The Music of Nashville: Season 2, Volume 2 is the fourth soundtrack album for the American musical drama television series Nashville, created by Academy Award winner Callie Khouri and starring Connie Britton as country music superstar Rayna Jaymes and Hayden Panettiere as new star Juliette Barnes. The album was released on May 6, 2014 through Big Machine Records.

Unlike the previous volumes, the Target deluxe edition contains nearly twice as many tracks as the standard edition; they are interspersed throughout the album rather than added to the standard album's listing. The UK release, again unlike the previous volumes, contains all 21 tracks listed below rather than conforming to the standard edition.

The album's biggest hits are "Black Roses" by Clare Bowen and Hayden Panettiere's "Don't Put Dirt on my Grave Just Yet". Although the latter failed to chart officially, "Don't Put Dirt on my Grave Just Yet" appeared on the iTunes chart, likely peaking its position somewhere in the seventies.

Track listing

Charts

Weekly charts

Year-end charts

References

Television soundtracks
2014 soundtrack albums
Big Machine Records soundtracks
Country music soundtracks
Music of Nashville: Season 2, Volume 2